Parides vercingetorix is a species of butterfly in the family Papilionidae. It is endemic to French Guiana. Formerly, this species was known as Parides coelus and originally described as Papilio coelus by Jean Baptiste Boisduval in 1836, but that name was already used in 1781 by Stoll for the butterfly now known as Aguna coelus. Consequently, the Parides species had to receive a new name.

Description
Forewing with a white spot, obsolete at the margins, which fills up the extremity of the cell, and extends on to the disc. Hindwing with red band on the disc, in the male composed of four spots, in the female of six. A full description is provided by Rothschild, W. and Jordan, K. (1906)

Description from Seitz

P. coelus Boisd. (male = vercingetorix Oberth.) (Id). Forewing with a white spot, obsolete at the
margins, which fills up the extremity of the cell, and extends on to the disc. Hindwing with red band on
the disc, in the male composed of four spots, in the female of six. — French Guiana, the male in Oberthur's Collection,
one female in the Paris Museum.

Taxonomy
Parides vercingetorix is a member of the chabrias species group

The members are
Parides chabrias 
Parides coelus 
Parides hahneli 
Parides mithras 
Parides pizarro 
Parides quadratus

Status
A rare little known species.

References

Lewis, H. L., 1974 Butterflies of the World  Page 26, figure 6, female

External links 

Endemic fauna of French Guiana
Lepidoptera of French Guiana
vercingetorix
Papilionidae of South America
Taxonomy articles created by Polbot